Andre the Seal (May 16, 1961 – July 19, 1986) was a male harbor seal pup found off the island of Robinson's Rock in Penobscot Bay, Maine, United States.

Life 
The seal was adopted by Harry Goodridge, who was then a tree surgeon and the Harbormaster of Rockport, Maine. Harry raised the pup, hoping the seal would become his scuba diving companion, and expecting that the seal would eventually return to the wild when given the opportunity.  Instead, Andre chose to stay with Harry in Rockport until his death in 1986.

Depictions in media and art 

The multi-faceted story that developed over the course of their 25-year bond has been well-documented in hundreds of news articles, several books, a 1994 feature film released by Paramount Pictures, and a PBS documentary.

Andre's fame and popularity even resulted in a memorial statue by Jane Wasey being built in his honour in Rockport, Maine harbour.

See also 
 Hoover (seal)

References

External links 
 

1961 animal births
1986 animal deaths
Individual seals and sea lions
Individual wild animals